Olga Iakinfovna Kuzeneva (1887-1978) was a Russian botanist who specialized in conifers.  She identified at least five species.

References 

1887 births
1978 deaths
People from Dukhovshchina
People from Dukhovshchinsky Uyezd
Soviet botanists
20th-century Russian botanists
Russian women botanists